D-5-YB-TV is a commercial television station owned by GMA Network Inc. Its transmitter is located at Pancil, Brgy. Looc, Sibulan, Negros Oriental, Philippines.

Although its programs are from GMA 7 Cebu, most of the program line-up are derived from GMA 7 Manila.

GMA TV-5 Dumaguete Programs
Balitang Bisdak - flagship regional newscast (simulcast over TV-7 Cebu)
GMA Regional TV Live! - flagship morning newscast (simulcast over TV-7 Cebu)

See also
DYSS-TV
List of GMA Network stations

GMA Network stations
Television stations in Dumaguete
Television stations in Negros Oriental
Television channels and stations established in 1993
1993 establishments in the Philippines